Tiannah's Empire is a Nigerian reality television series that premiered on 22 April 2017, on Ebonylife TV, starring Toyin Lawani-Adebayo (best known as Toyin Lawani), and Oluwatenola Jermaine Womandi. The show focused on Toyin Lawani, as she juggles the many roles she plays in 30 different businesses and being a mum of two kids, Tiannah and Tenor.; from mother to stylist, to designer, to a friend.

Casting
In Season 1, Episode 2, Seyi Shay, and Skuki makes an appearance on the show. In Season 1, Episode 3, Ben Murray-Bruce makes an appearance on the show. In Season 1, Episode 5, Florence Ita Giwa makes an appearance on the show. In Season 1, Episode 6, Emmanuel Ikubese makes an appearance on the show. In Season 1, Episode 9, Denrele Edun makes an appearance on the show. In Season 1, Episode 10 and 11, Annie Macaulay-Idibia makes an appearance on the show.

Episodes
</onlyinclude>

Season 1 (2017)

Season 2 (2018)

Production
The reality television series was produced by EbonyLife Studios, and distributed by EbonyLife Films. The series was produced and directed by Priscilla Nzirimo-Nwanah. The show was executive produced by Mo Abudu, and premiered on EbonyLife On, an online movie streaming television network, on August 2, 2018.

References

External links
 Tiannah’s Empire

2017 Nigerian television series debuts
Nigerian reality television series
Ebonylife TV original programming